The 1930 Hollywood Stars season, was the fifth season for the original Hollywood Stars baseball team. The team, which began in 1903 as the Sacramento Solons, moved to Hollywood in 1926 and played in the Pacific Coast League (PCL). 

The 1930 PCL season ran from April 8 to October 19, 1930. The Stars, led by manager Ossie Vitt, finished first in the Pacific Coast League (PCL) with a 119–81 record. The PCL provided for a championship series to be played between the teams with best records in the first and second halves of the season. The Stars qualified for the championship series by compiling the best record in the second half of the season. In the championship series, the Stars and defeated the Los Angeles Angels, four games to one.

First baseman Mickey Heath appeared in 174 games, compiled a .324 batting average, led the team with 136 RBIs and 19 stolen bases, and led tied for PCL lead with 37 home runs.

Catcher Hank Severeid appeared in 129 games and led the team with a .367 batting average.

Jesse Hill led the team with a .592 slugging percentage and led the circuit with 13 triples.

Pitcher Ed Baecht compiled a 26-12 record and led the PCL with a 3.24 earned run average (ERA).

Statistics

Batting 
Note: Pos = Position; G = Games played; AB = At bats; H = Hits; Avg. = Batting average; HR = Home runs; SLG = Slugging percentage; RBI = Runs batted in; SB = Stolen bases

Pitching 
Note: G = Games pitched; IP = Innings pitched; W = Wins; L = Losses; PCT = Win percentage; ERA = Earned run average; SO = Strikeouts

References

Further reading
 "The Greatest Minor League: A History of the Pacific Coast League, 1903-1957", by Dennis Snelling (McFarland 2011)

1930 in sports in California
Pacific Coast League seasons